The 1961 Stanford Indians football team represented Stanford University in the 1961 NCAA University Division football season. The team was led by Jack Curtice in his fourth year. The team played their home games at Stanford Stadium in Stanford, California.

Schedule

References

Stanford
Stanford Cardinal football seasons
Stanford Indians football